Flight and expulsion of Germans during and after World War II may refer to:
Flight and evacuation of German civilians during the end of World War II
Flight and expulsion of Germans (1944–50)